Gemophos ringens, the ringed cantharus, is a species of sea snail in the family Pisaniidae.

References

Pisaniidae
Gastropods described in 1846